School for Heroes is a children's fantasy duology written by Jackie French.

Plot
The novels revolve around Boojum "Boo" Bark, a werewolf puppy from the town of Sleepy Whiskers - a town within a world of werewolves. He attends the School for Heroes, located within a volcano and run by the retired heroes from the Rest in Pieces retirement home.

2009 children's books
2010 children's books
Series of children's books
Fantasy books by series
Children's fantasy novels
Australian children's novels
Australian fantasy novels
Australian adventure novels
HarperCollins books